Mubarak Ata Mubarak (born 17 December 1981) is a Saudi Arabian hurdler. His personal best time is 13.68 seconds, achieved in July 2004 in Lapinlahti.

He won the gold medal at the 2000 Asian Championships, the silver medal at the 2002 Asian Championships and finished fifth at the 2005 Asian Championships. He also competed at the 2001 World Championships as well as the Olympic Games in 2000 and 2004 without reaching the final.

International competitions

References 

1981 births
Living people
Saudi Arabian male hurdlers
Olympic athletes of Saudi Arabia
Athletes (track and field) at the 2000 Summer Olympics
Athletes (track and field) at the 2004 Summer Olympics
Athletes (track and field) at the 2002 Asian Games
Athletes (track and field) at the 2006 Asian Games
World Athletics Championships athletes for Saudi Arabia
Asian Games competitors for Saudi Arabia
Islamic Solidarity Games competitors for Saudi Arabia
Islamic Solidarity Games medalists in athletics
20th-century Saudi Arabian people
21st-century Saudi Arabian people